Sellerdeck Ltd, formerly Actinic, is a British ecommerce platform founded in 1996. In 2000 it floated on the London Stock Exchange, raising £21 million.

Sellerdeck offers a desktop based eCommerce platform which runs on Perl as well as other services such as Digital Marketing, SEO improvements and migration to the Magento platform.

References

External links 

Electronic trading systems